Christian Johansen was a Danish cyclist. He competed in two events at the 1920 Summer Olympics.

References

External links
 

Year of birth missing
Year of death missing
Danish male cyclists
Olympic cyclists of Denmark
Cyclists at the 1920 Summer Olympics
Place of birth missing